Royal Air Force Khormaksar or more simply RAF Khormaksar was a Royal Air Force (RAF) station in Aden, Yemen. Its motto was "Into the Remote Places". During the 1960s, it was the base for nine squadrons and became the RAF's busiest-ever station as well as the biggest staging post for the RAF between the United Kingdom and Singapore.

It later became Aden International Airport.

History
Established in 1917, RAF Khormaksar was enlarged in 1945 as the British spread their influence deeper into the Arabian Peninsula. No. 8 Squadron RAF arrived in 1927, and stayed until 1945, operating the Fairey IIIF, Vickers Vincent, Hawker Demon, Martin Maryland, Fairey Swordfish, and the Lockheed Hudson.

On 10 June 1940, Italy declared war on Britain and France, and Aden quickly became an important British base for the East African Campaign. Khormaksar launched its first combat sorties three days later, when 8 Squadron sent nine Bristol Blenheims to bomb an airfield at Assab in Italian Eritrea, across the Red Sea from Aden on 12 June. Five Vincents attacking the same airfield that night. On 5 August 1940, Italy invaded British Somaliland, and 8 Squadron's Blenheims flew missions against advancing Italian troop columns. The Italians heavily outnumbered the British and Commonwealth defences, and the port of Berbera, immediately south of Aden across the Gulf of Aden, was occupied by the Italians on 19 August.

8 Squadron continued to be based at Khormaksar equipped with Blenheims. The squadron flew Vickers Wellington XIIIs were flown from December 1943 until May 1945.

In 1943 a Communication Squadron, HQ British Forces Aden Communication Squadron, was established here. It changed names twice in 1951 and 1955 before being disbanded in 1956.

In 1958, a state of emergency was declared in Aden as Yemeni forces occupied nearby Jebel Jehaf and RAF squadrons were involved in action in support of the British Army. In the 1960s, during operations around Rhadfan, the station reached a peak of activity, becoming overcrowded and attracting ground attacks by rebels. In 1966, the newly elected Labour government in the United Kingdom announced that all forces would be withdrawn by 1968. 

In May 1967, it was expected that planned final force levels at Kormaksar ahead of the January 1968 withdrawal would be:
*The Army element, comprising Tactical Headquarters Aden Brigade, one commando, one battalion, one armoured car troop, one light artillery troop, one engineer troop and elements of the small Joint Headquarters. Total of some 1,150 personnel.

*The RAF element, comprising a squadron of Hunters and a Wessex flight (both with servicing support parties), a visiting aircraft servicing party, the Communications Centre, elements of an ATOC, movements, airfield services and elements of the Joint Headquarters. Total of some 350 personnel.

Khormaksar played a role in the evacuation of British families from Aden in the summer of 1967. The station closed on 29 November 1967.

Units and aircraft

No. 8 Squadron RAF was based at Khormaksar on eight occasions:
1927–1945 operating the Fairey IIIF, Vickers Vincent, Hawker Demon, Bristol Blenheim, Martin Maryland, Fairey Swordfish, Lockheed Hudson and Vickers Wellington
1946–1950 operating the de Havilland Mosquito, Hawker Tempest and Bristol Brigand
1950–1951 operating the Bristol Brigand, Avro Anson and Auster AOP6
1951–1952 as before
1952–1953 operating the Bristol Brigand and de Havilland Vampire
1953–1956 operating the de Havilland Vampire and de Havilland Venom
1956–1961 operating the de Havilland Venom, Gloster Meteor and Hawker Hunter
1960–1967 operating the Hawker Hunter FGA.9 and T.7
1960–1963 operating the Hawker Hunter FR.10

No. 84 Squadron RAF were based between 1956 and 1967 and operated the Vickers Valetta, Bristol Sycamore, Percival Pembroke, Blackburn Beverley and Hawker Siddeley Andover.

See also
 British Forces Aden
 Air Forces Middle East

References

Citations

Bibliography

 Sturtivant, Ray, ISO and John Hamlin. RAF Flying Training And Support Units since 1912. Tonbridge, Kent, UK: Air-Britain (Historians) Ltd., 2007. .

External links
Crest Badge and Information of RAF Khormaksar
Personal histories and photos from RAF Khormaksar in the 1960s
Photos from RAF Khormaksar in the mid 1960s
Aircraft stationed and visiting RAF Khormaksar

Khormaksar
Khor
Airports in Yemen
Aden
World War II airfields in the Aden Protectorate
World War II sites in Aden